John Haines (1825 – 27 May 1894) was an English first-class cricketer active 1865–67 who played for Middlesex. He was born and died in St Pancras. He played in two first-class matches.

References

1825 births
1894 deaths
English cricketers
Middlesex cricketers